Sheryl Franks (born May 26, 1961 in New Orleans, Louisiana) is an American former pair skater who competed with Michael Botticelli.

The couple won the bronze medal at the United States Figure Skating Championships four consecutive times (from 1977–80), won the Eastern US Pairs Championship in 1977-79, and placed ninth in the World Championships in 1977-79, and 10th in 1980.

They finished seventh at the 1980 Winter Olympic Games.

Franks subsequently became a skating coach, forming The Sheryl Franks Creative Skating Academy in West Newton, Massachusetts, and choreographed for future Olympian for Israel Aimee Buchanan.

Results
(pairs with Michael Botticelli)

References

External links
Sports-Reference.com
The Sheryl Franks Creative Skating Academy

1961 births
American female pair skaters
Olympic figure skaters of the United States
Figure skaters at the 1980 Winter Olympics
Living people
21st-century American women
20th-century American women